Primas is a 95-minute 2017 Canadian documentary film directed by Laura Bari. It is a coming-of-age portrait of two Argentine teenagers who, in the wake of odious crimes that interrupted their childhood, free themselves from the shadows of the past. First in Argentina, then during an initiatory trip to Canada, the two girls, Rocío and Aldana, grow up, expressing through their bodies what their imagination reveals, their unique perspective and their unwavering resistance.

Primas had its international premiere at International Documentary Film Festival Amsterdam and was also selected at the Mar del Plata International Film Festival in  Argentina and at the !f Istanbul Independent Film Festival, winning the international competition's Audience Award and the Love and Change Jury Award respectively.

The film was released in Canada in the fall of 2018.

References

External links 

  Primas Vimeo teaser
 

2017 films
2017 documentary films
2010s coming-of-age films
Canadian documentary films
Documentary films about children
Documentary films about child abuse
Documentary films about feminism
Films shot in Montreal
Films set in Montreal
Quebec films
Spanish-language Canadian films
2010s Canadian films